Maxim Sozontovich Berezovsky ((?) — 2 April 1777) was a composer, opera singer, bassist and violinist, who studied in Italy and worked at the St. Petersburg Court Chapel in the Russian Empire. 

He was one of the first Russian Imperial composers in the 18th century to be recognized throughout the world and the first-known to compose an opera, symphony, and violin sonata. His most popular works are his sacred choral pieces written for the Orthodox Church. Much of his work has been lost; only three of the eighteen known choral concertos have been found. Dmitry Bortniansky was thought to be the first Russian Imperial symphonic composer until the discovery in 2002 of Berezovsky's Symphony in C by Steven Fox in the Vatican archives, composed around 1770 to 1772.

Early life
Not much is known about Maxim Berezovsky's biography. The composer's father, most likely, belonged to the petty nobility. Contemporary descendants of Pavel Sozontovich Berezovsky, who is believed to be Maxim's brother, associate the family's origins with the Glukhov Cossacks. The Berezovsky coat of arms has also been preserved, testifying to his family's Polish origins. His life story was reconstructed in a short novel written in 1840 by Nestor Kukolnik and a play by Peter Smirnov staged at the Alexandrine Theatre in Saint Petersburg. Many particulars from these works of fiction had been accepted as fact, but have since been proven inaccurate.

It was previously believed that Berezovsky had been born on 16 (27) October 1745. This year, first mentioned by the teacher Petr Belikov of the St. Petersburg Court Capella, then accepted by Russian scholars, is however not confirmed in any documents. In various 19th-century Russian and Western sources other dates can be found: 1743, 1742, and even 1725.

His birthplace is uncertain, but according to many sources is Glukhov, at that time the main residence of the Hetman of Zaporizhian Host (now Hlukhiv, a small town in the Sumy Oblast of Ukraine). In the 18th century, Glukhov served as the capital of the Cossack Hetmanate and the administrative center of the Little Russia Governorate. It is likely that Berezovsky spent a part of his childhood in the city of Glukhov, since it was then a major center of training for choristers destined for St. Petersburg's Capella. Today there is a monument to Maxim Berezovsky in Glukhov.

In some sources, Berezovsky is referred to as a graduate of the Glukhov Music School. However, his name does not appear in the surviving documents of this institution. Since the school in Glukhov was the only one in the Russian Empire training singers for the Imperial Court Choir, it is likely that he did spend at least some of his childhood there.

The 19th-century authors claimed that Berezovsky had also received education at the Kiev Theological Academy. The Academy's acts and documents that were made public in the early 20th century mentioned five persons with his surname but had no record of Maxim Berezovsky.

Education

The first historically verifiable information about Berezovsky can be traced back to 1758. On 29 June 1758, he was accepted as a singer into the Prince Peter Fedorovich of Russia capella in Oranienbaum (now known as Lomonosov), near Saint Petersburg. Berezovsky participated in Italian operas and his name appears in printed librettos of the operas Alessandro nell'Indie by Francesco Araja and La Semiramide riconosciuta by Vincenzo Manfredini given in Oranienbaum in 1759 and 1760.

In 1762, he became a singer of the Italian Capella of the Saint Petersburg Imperial palace, which was the palace chapel choir. Here he studied under singer N. Garani and Capella director F. Zoppis and likely under composers Vincenzo Manfredini and Baldassare Galuppi. He continued as court musician and composer for the majority of the 1760s.

In 1763, Berezovsky wed Franzina Uberscher (also translated as Francisca Iberchere), a graduate of the Oranienbaum theatrical school. Not much is known about their life together. When he died in 1777, the composer's government funeral allowance was given to court singer J. Timchenko. This implies that Berezovsky was either separated or widowed from his wife during his final days, since this allowance would normally be given to the wife of the deceased.

Berezovsky was sent to Italy in the spring of 1769 to train with renowned teacher padre Giovanni Battista Martini at the Bologna Philharmonic Academy, where he graduated with distinction. Along with fellow graduate Josef Mysliveček, Berezowsky's exam task was to compose a polyphonic work on a given theme.  This was a similar exam to the one given to his fellow alumnus Wolfgang Amadeus Mozart several months earlier, after which both graduated with distinction. Berezovsky's piece for four voices is still kept in the Academy's archives. On 15 May 1771 he became a member of the Accademia Filarmonica.

Later years
His opera Demofonte to the Italian libretto by Pietro Metastasio was staged in Livorno, Italy, and premiered in February 1773.

Berezovsky returned to Saint Petersburg in October 1773 (early biographies indicate that he returned in 1775). According to archival discoveries in the late 20th century, Berezovsky was appointed a staff member of the Imperial Theater and kapellmeister of the Royal Court Capella eight months later. This was a high ranking position for a musician and contradicts the notion that Berezovsky's talent was not appreciated upon his return to Saint Petersburg. Some sources state that he committed suicide as a result of depression for not being accepted upon his return to Saint Petersburg. His first biographer, Eugene Bolkhovitinov, made this assertion in 1804 based on testimonials of those who knew Berezovsky. Marina Ritzarev, a contemporary scholar, asserts that he did not commit suicide but rather likely caught a sudden fever resulting in his death after developing mental illness. He died in Saint Petersburg on 24 March (2 April N.S.) 1777.

Legacy 

Berezovsky is known as an author of sacred concertos, written after returning from Italy. The most popular among them is the concerto "Do not reject me in old age". He combined in his work the experience of Western European musical culture of that time with the national traditions of choir art. Together with Bortniansky he created a classical type of choral concerto.

Sacred music

Berezovsky's sacred musical works include the Liturgy, communion poems, a song of praise and a number of concertos, of which only a small part has survived. In addition to Church Slavonic texts, Berezovsky also used texts in English (praise song) and German ("Unser Vater").

Communion verses are written on the texts of psalms mostly of a grateful nature, most of them a distinguished by lyrical embodiment (except for "Rejoice in the righteous" and "Praise the Lord from heaven" № 3 solemn-panegyric imagery). The choral texture is quite diverse, some works have a constant harmonic texture (eg "Praise the Lord from heaven" № 1), others combine harmonic with imitation ("Into the whole earth"), or use polyphonic ("Blessed is he who has chosen"), in particular, fugue ("Praise the Lord from heaven" № 2). Even brighter than in the Liturgy, the melody of voices is observed in the sacramental verses. The melody of the poems is expressive and diverse, and often bears a resemblance to the typical inversions of Ukrainian lyrical songs. Four communion hymns are musically related to the Kyivan tradition of liturgical chant and to Ukrainian folk songs. According to Encyclopedia of Ukraine, Berezovsky was the first composer of early Classicist style in Ukrainian music, and one of the creators of the Ukrainian choral style in sacred music. 

Sacred concertos occupy a prominent place in the composer's legacy, and were raised, as a genre, to the highest musical and artistic level. Choral concertos inherited many features of party concertos, including a combination of chord and polyphonic textures, but also absorbed the traditions of Western European music, including a new harmonious language with a functional-harmonic system. All concertos are multi-part cycles composed on the principle of figurative, tempo and textural contrast, but united by thematic integrity, which is achieved by intonation connections between the extreme parts, and in the last concerto - throughout the work. The most famous is the concerto "Do not reject me in old age", published by the Court Chapel in St. Petersburg in 1842. In the 2000s, thanks to M. Yurchenko's research activities 11 more concertos were published and thus, as of 2020, 12 concertos were published.

Opera Demofonte
The composer's only opera, Demofonte, was composed in Italy and staged in Livorno in 1773, which is attested to in an article in a local newspaper Notizie del mondo. Only 4 arias from this opera have survived, which testify to the composer's close ties with the Neapolitan and Venetian opera schools. Focusing on the current trends in the development of the opera series, Berezovsky shows emotionality and sincerity in his music, sensual tenderness and nobility, melodic beauty.

Sonata for violin and harpsichord
The only known instrumental work by Berezovsky is the Sonata for Violin and Harpsichord, written in Pisa in 1772. The manuscript of this sonata had been kept in the Paris National Library.

The sonata has three movements, with a pair of fast movements framing a slow middle. As in Demofonte, Berezovsky imitates the traditions of Western European music of those days, clearly showing his lyrical talent

Symphony in C major
In the early 2000s, American conductor Stephen Fox discovered Berezovsky's Symphony in C,  also known in Ukraine as Symphony No. 1, in the Vatican archives. This composition from 1770–72 had been considered lost since the 18th century, like most of his work. After its premiere in Russia, it was spoked of as being part of the country's cultural heritage and called the "First Russian Symphony". Kirill Karabits, who conducted the symphony's Ukrainian premiere, said that both Russia and Ukraine have equal claim to the composer's legacy, saying that "Russians have the right to call Berezovsky 'Russian' and [Ukrainians] have a right to call him 'Ukrainian.'"

Cultural influence
Andrei Tarkovsky's 1983 film Nostalghia is "a commentary on exile as told through Berezovsky's life".

See also
Dmitry Bortniansky
List of Russian composers 
List of Ukrainian composers

References

Notes

Citations

Sources
 Korniy L. (1998) History of Ukrainian music. Vol.2. Kyiv; Kharkiv, New-York: M. P. Kotz. 
 Pryashnikova, Margarita (2003). "Maxim Berezovsky and His Secular Works". Text of the booklet to the CD Maxim Berezovsky (early 1740s – 1777) Pratum Integrum Orchestra
 Encyclopedia of Ukraine, Article on Maksym Berezovsky
 Ritzarev, Marina (2013), Maxim Berezovsky: Zhizn i tvorchestvo kompozitora [Maxim Berezovsky: Life and Work of the Composer]. Saint Petersburg, Kompozitor, 227 p. 
 Ritzarev, Marina (1983), Kompositor M.S. Berezovsky (Musika)
 Ritzarev, Marina (2006), Eighteenth-Century Russian Music (Ashgate) 
 Yurchenko, Mstyslav (2000). Text of booklet to the CD Ukrainian Sacred Music Vol. 1: Maksym Berezovsky
 Yurchenko, Mstyslav (2001). Text of booklet to the CD Sacred Music by Maksym Berezovsky

External links

 

1745 births
1777 deaths
People from Hlukhiv
People from the Cossack Hetmanate
Ukrainian people in the Russian Empire
Classical-period composers
Classical composers of church music
Russian opera composers
Ukrainian opera composers
Russian male classical composers
Ukrainian classical composers
Russian male opera singers
Ukrainian male opera singers
18th-century classical composers